Jerry Angelo Brooks (born December 16, 1965), commonly known by his stage name J. B. Smoove, is an American actor, comedian and writer.  After beginning his career in 1995 on Def Comedy Jam, he was a writer and performer on NBC's Saturday Night Live (2003–06). He is best known for his starring roles on HBO's Curb Your Enthusiasm (2007–present) and the CBS sitcom The Millers (2013–15). He also portrayed a fictionalized version of himself on the BET improv-comedy reality television parody Real Husbands of Hollywood (2013–16).

Early life 
Smoove was born in Plymouth, North Carolina, to parents Elizabeth and Floyd Brooks. From the time he was three years old, he grew up in Mount Vernon, New York. He spent a significant amount of time with his mother and extended maternal family in the Plymouth area, which he has said inspired much of his pursuit of comedy and comedy style. In Mount Vernon, he grew up in the Levister Towers housing projects with his two younger brothers. Smoove's father died from diabetes when Smoove was 15 years old.

In 1983, Smoove graduated from Mount Vernon High School. He attended Norfolk State University in Virginia, studying engineering and graphic design.

Smoove worked as a perfume formulator and sold fire extinguishers door-to-door.

Career

Smoove has had recurring roles on Everybody Hates Chris and Saturday Night Live. On SNL, he worked as a writer (and had bit roles in sketches, including playing Jimmy "JJ" Walker in a parody of the 1970s sitcom Good Times) and was a recipient of the 2007 Writers Guild of America award for Best Comedy/Variety Series (Including Talk). He was on Saturday Night Live for three years.

Smoove has been a regular cast member on the HBO comedy Curb Your Enthusiasm since its sixth season in 2007, playing Leon Black. Smoove got the role of Leon on Curb Your Enthusiasm after his stint on SNL. Although he was at that time based on the East Coast, he was in Los Angeles for his friend, music producer Oji Pierce's funeral, so was able to audition for Curb Your Enthusiasm.  Smoove wrote a book as his Curb Your Enthusiasm character, Leon, which was released on October 10, 2017.

He had a major role for seasons two and three on the FOX network sitcom 'Til Death with Brad Garrett and Joely Fisher. In June 2008, he taped several episodes of The Gong Show with Dave Attell as one of the celebrity judges. Smoove was also a cast member on the short-lived sketch comedy program Cedric the Entertainer Presents. He hosted the standup comedy series Russell Simmons Presents: Stand-Up at The El Rey on Comedy Central in July 2010 and also appeared on an episode of The Simpsons titled '"Angry Dad: The Movie" in February 2011. Also in 2011, he starred in the American Dad! episode "The Worst Stan" and appeared in an episode of Kick Buttowski: Suburban Daredevil called "Dude, Where's My Wade".

In 2012, his first televised comedy special, JB Smoove: That's How I Dooz It, premiered on Comedy Central. The DVD of the special was released April 3, 2012. In 2013, Smoove voiced Hackus in The Smurfs 2. Smoove appeared in Movie 43 in the segment "The Proposition" alongside Anna Faris and Chris Pratt. He was the substitute co-host of the New York City morning talk show Good Day New York with Rosanna Scotto on April 9, 2012. He had a cameo as a grave digger in the episode of Louie entitled "Barney/Never". He also played a supporting role in Season 4, Episode 7 "The Vapora Sport" in the American sitcom The League on FX.  He plays Wheelchair Guy, with whom the main characters have recurring comedic run-ins. He plays one of the "Replacers" for Call of Duty: Black Ops II. He was in the show Real Husbands of Hollywood, where he played a fictionalized version of himself.

Smoove hosts a talk show on the MSG Network called Four Courses With JB Smoove. He provides the voice of Dr. Ray De Angelo Harris, host of the Chakra Attack radio show in the video game Grand Theft Auto V. Smoove appeared in the 2013 film Dealin' with Idiots as Coach Ted. In 2013, he became a regular cast member of the CBS comedy The Millers, playing the character Ray.

In the summer of 2014, Smoove hosted the eighth season of the NBC reality series Last Comic Standing.

In July 2016, Smoove appeared on comedian Jerry Seinfeld's web series, Comedians in Cars Getting Coffee.

In 2017, Smoove played Santa in Sia's music video, "Santa's Coming for Us".

In 2019, Smoove attended the final dinner service of  Hell’s Kitchen'''s eighteenth season Hell's Kitchen: Rookies vs. Veterans as a chef’s table guest in the blue kitchen that was run by runner-up Mia Castro. He appeared as a guest judge on the first season of the FOX reality singing competition The Masked Singer. He also voiced Frank in Harley Quinn beginning in 2019, as well as playing Julius Dell in the Marvel Studios film Spider-Man: Far From Home and its 2021 sequel Spider-Man: No Way Home.

In 2020, Smoove starred in Mapleworth Murders opposite Paula Pell and John Lutz for Quibi.  Smoove won the 2021 Primetime Emmy Award for Outstanding Actor in a Short Form Comedy or Drama Series for his role.

In April 2021, Smoove, alongside his cohost Miles Grose, created May I Elaborate? Daily Wisdom from JB Smoove, a podcast on the Team Coco podcast network. Beginning in the fall of 2021, Smoove had a recurring role as the titular Caesar in multiple commercials for the Caesars Sportsbook mobile app, appearing alongside Patton Oswalt, Halle Berry, Vince Vaughn, and the Manning family.

 Volunteering 
Smoove serves on the board of directors of the Boys & Girls Club of Mount Vernon. On November 7, 2017, he emceed the Boys and Girls Clubs Future Leaders Gala at The Beverly Hilton in Beverly Hills, CA.

 Personal life 
In 2007, Smoove married singer Shahidah Omar. They live together in Los Angeles. He has an adult daughter from a previous relationship. He shortened his name, Jerry Brooks, to "J. B." and added "Smoove" as his last name when he began performing stand-up comedy. He is a fan of the New York Knicks, New York Yankees and the New York Jets.

In 2019, Smoove played for the "Home" roster during the NBA All-Star Celebrity Game at the Bojangles' Coliseum in Charlotte, North Carolina. The roster was made up of celebrities with Carolina roots.

He has been vegan since 2018.

 Comedy specials 

 JB Smoove: That's How I Dooz It'' (2012)

Filmography

Films

Television

Video games

References

External links

 
May I Elaborate? Daily Wisdom from JB Smoove – podcast
 

1965 births
Living people
Actors from Mount Vernon, New York
African-American male actors
African-American stand-up comedians
American male film actors
American male television actors
American male television writers
American male voice actors
American stand-up comedians
American television writers
Comedians from New York (state)
Male actors from New York (state)
Male actors from North Carolina
Norfolk State University alumni
People from Plymouth, North Carolina
Screenwriters from New York (state)
Screenwriters from North Carolina
Writers from Mount Vernon, New York
20th-century American comedians
21st-century American comedians
20th-century American male actors
21st-century American male actors
20th-century African-American people
21st-century African-American people
Mount Vernon High School (New York) alumni